Fell is a collaborative effort between musicians Andrew Hulme and Paul Schütze, released independently through 7° in 1996.

Track listing

Personnel 
Anne-Louise Falson – design
Andrew Hulme – instruments, production
Paul Schütze – instruments, production
Peter Woodhead – photography

References 

1996 albums
Paul Schütze albums
Albums produced by Paul Schütze